"Everyone" is the ninth and final episode of the first series of the British teen drama Skins. It was written by Bryan Elsley and directed by Adam Smith. It first aired on E4 in the UK on 22 March 2007. Contrarily to the season's other episodes, it does not focus particularly on one character but on the group as a whole, a first for the show.

Plot

It's Anwar's 17th birthday. He receives a call from his best friend Maxxie, who wishes him a happy birthday. Anwar invites Maxxie to his party. Maxxie declines, however, saying he will only go if Anwar tells his very strict Muslim parents that Maxxie is gay. Anwar declines and begins his day by being told off by his father for missing prayer, and having to put up with his annoying uncle from Sutton Coldfield.

In the meantime, Tony sadly watches his sister Effy head off to her new school, local independent school with fellow pupils such as shallow, unstable Abigail Stock for company. Chris is put-out, too, when his girlfriend (and psychology teacher) Angie's fiancé, an Australian weatherman named Merve, turns up. Chris is furious at Angie for her infidelity, and something strikes him about Merve, but he can't quite put his finger on it.

Sid attempts writing a love letter to Cassie, but gives up and decides instead to go see her at the hospital, leaving the love letter on his desk. Putting on the first clothes he could find, Sid marches to the private psychiatric hospital in mis-matched clothes with odd shoes and socks and tells the nurse he "needs to speak to someone" and that he has "stuff going on", and finds himself detained against his will into a padded cell.

Cassie, meanwhile, writes Sid a letter saying she is moving to Elgin that night and leaves the hospital with her bulimic friend.

Michelle meets Effy and asks her why she doesn't ever speak and why Tony hurt her. Later that day, Chris breaks into Angie's house and is horrified to find countless photos of her and Merve, and an engagement ring. He pockets the ring, and watches a video of Merve doing the Australian weather forecast, assuming from Merve's camp mannerisms that Merve is gay. Angie and Merve show up and Chris apologises for breaking into her house, but taunts Merve about his supposed hidden sexuality.

Anwar's uncle is DJing for the birthday party; unimpressed with the tacky disco music, Anwar complains. His dad initially tells him his uncle should DJ because he has a proper ear for music so that Anwar's English friends don't burn the place down, however, once out of earshot of Anwar's mother, he confesses that Anwar's uncle is an "arsehole" and notes grimly that while he's DJing, he can't grope women. Anwar then expects to get the best birthday present ever as a friend of his sisters' shows interest in him. He begins kissing her, but leaves to gossip to Maxxie, who is waiting outside. While Anwar is begging Maxxie to come inside, his dad comes outside and the two boys reveal that Maxxie is gay. Anwar's dad doesn't seem to mind and invites Maxxie inside regardless.

Tony and Effy rescue Sid from the hospital, bring clothes with them, and take him to find Cassie, assuming she'll be at Anwar's birthday party. Sid arrives at the party at roughly the same time as Merve, who demands his ring back off Chris. Chris gives the ring to Angie, who gives it back to Merve, turning down his proposal, but also breaking up with Chris. A fight breaks out in the club between the English and the Australians.

Tony finds Cassie outside and gives her Sid's love letter. He then tries to call Michelle, who is crying in the bathroom. Struggling to find a good connection, Tony walks out onto the road and is hit by a bus, directly in front of Effy. Before being hit, he is able to leave a voicemail on Michelle's phone, proclaiming his love for her. Sid leaves the club to find Cassie and meets her by her favourite spot in the city, where she tried to commit suicide.

Acting

Main Cast
 Nicholas Hoult as Tony Stonem
 Joe Dempsie as Chris Miles
 Mike Bailey as Sid Jenkins
 Hannah Murray as Cassie Ainsworth
 April Pearson as Michelle Richardson
 Larissa Wilson as Jal Fazer
 Dev Patel as Anwar Kharral
 Mitch Hewer as Maxxie Oliver

Arc significance and continuity
 Tony is hit by a bus, causing him to regress in the next season
 Effy witnesses Tony being hit by a bus, causing her to speak
 Cassie leaves Bristol to move to Scotland.
 Angie leaves Chris, Merv and Bristol.
 Maxxie and Anwar reconcile when Anwar tells Istiak that Maxxie is gay.

Soundtrack
 I've Been So Lonely for So Long by Frederick Knight
 You Can't Hurry Love by The Concretes
 The Owls Go by Architecture in Helsinki
 Sky Holds the Sun by The Bees
 Or Just Rearrange by Micah P. Hinson
 Happy Birthday by Altered Images
 Life is Life by Opus
 Bat Out of Hell by Meat Loaf
 It's All Over by The Broken Family Band
 Everything Changes by Take That
 I Don't Want to Miss a Thing by Aerosmith
 Give a Little Bit by Supertramp
 We Built This City by Starship
 Final Countdown by Europe
 Pow (Forward) by Lethal Bizzle
 True Love Ways by Buddy Holly
 Wild World by Mike Bailey, Nicholas Hoult, Siwan Morris and Joe Dempsie

References

External links 
 Watch "Everyone" on 4od
 Everyone at e4.com/skins
 Skins at Internet Movie DataBase

2007 British television episodes
British LGBT-related television episodes
Skins (British TV series) episodes
Television episodes about birthdays